This is a list of Kurdish dynasties, countries and autonomous territories. By the 10th century, the term "Kurd" did not have an ethnic connotation and referred to Iranian nomads in the region between Lake Van and Lake Urmia. In Arabic medieval sources, "Kurd" referred to non-Persian and non-Turkish nomads and semi-nomads (see Origin of the Kurds).

Early entities 

 Sadakiyans (770-827)
 Daysam (938–955)
 Hadhabanis (906–1080)
 Aishanids (912–961)
 Shaddadids (951–1199)
 Rawwadids (955–1071) 
 Hasanwayhids (959–1014)
 Marwanids (983–1096)
 Annazids (990/91–1117)
 Shabankara (11th century–12th century)
 Principality of Eğil (1049–1864, Diyarbakir)
 Hazaraspids (1115–1425)
 Ayyubid dynasty (1171–1341)
 Principality of Bitlis (1187–1847)
 Vassaldom of Ardalan (14th century–1865 or 1868)
 Zakarids (1161–1360)
 Emirate of Çemişgezek (13th century–1663)
 Mukriyan (14th century–19th century)
 Zarrinnaal Dynasty (1448–1925)
 Emirate of Pazooka (1499–1587)
 Principality of Suleyman (15th century–1838)
 Emirate of Soran (before 1514–1836)
 Emirate of Miks (?–1846)

Remnants of the Ayyubid Dynasty (13th century–19th century) 
Various Kurdish political entities blossomed in the period after the disestablishment of the Ayyubid dynasty in 1260. Some of these rulers claimed descent from the Ayyubids.
 Principality of Donboli (1210–1799)
 Emirate of Bingöl (1231–1864)
 Emirate of Hasankeyf (1232–1524)
 Emirate of Kilis
 Emirate of Şirvan (?–1840s)
 Emirate of Hakkâri (?–1845)
 Principality of Zirqan (1335–1835)
 Emirate of Bahdinan (1339–1843)
 Emirate of Bohtan (?–1833)
 Principality of Mahmudi (1406–1839)
 Principality of Pinyaşi (1548–1823)

Buffer zones between the Ottomans and Persia (13th century–19th century) 
For various reasons, Kurdish entities existed as buffer zones between the Ottoman Empire and Persia throughout history. These include:

 Khoy Khanate (1210–1799)
 Emirate of Palu (1495–1845)
 Emirate of Bradost (1510–1609)
 Baban (16th century–1850)
 Tabriz Khanate (1757–1799)
 Hasan Khan dynasty in Pish-e Kuh (1795–1820)
 Sarab Khanate (18th century)

Other dynasties of Kurdish ancestry 
 Safavid dynasty (1501–1736) – The dynasty was partly of Kurdish origin.
 Zand dynasty (1751-1794) – The dynasty is of Kurdish Lak origin.

20th-21st century entities 

 Kurdish State (1918–1919)
 Kingdom of Kurdistan (1921–1924 and 1925)
 Kurdistansky Uyezd (1923–1929) and Kurdistan Okrug (1930)
 Republic of Ararat (1927–1931)
 Republic of Mahabad (1946–1947)
 Republic of Laçin (1992)
 Islamic Emirate of Byara (2001–2003)

Current entities
Kurdistan Region (autonomous region in Iraq, 1970–present)
Autonomous Administration of North and East Syria (self-proclaimed autonomous region declared during the Syrian Civil War by the PYD) (2012–present)

Gallery

See also
Kurdish emirates
Kurdistan Eyalet
House of Kayus
Corduene

Bibliography

References

External links
 Historical map: Kurdish states in 1835
 Historical map: Kurdish political enclaves and territorial demands, 1919-98

Kurds
Kurdish
Kurdistan independence movement
Kurdish